Mauser is a German arms manufacturer.

Mauser may also refer to:

 Paul Mauser (1838–1914), German weapon designer and manufacturer/industrialist
 Wilhelm Mauser (1834–1882), German weapon designer and manufacturer/industrialist
 Siegfried Mauser (born 1954), German pianist